Schouwen is the name of a former island of the Dutch province of Zeeland.

Schouwen may also refer to:

People
Bautista van Schouwen (1943-1973), Chilian Movement of the Revolutionary founder

Place
Schouwen-Duiveland, Netherlands municipality